Due to the increase in population in last two decates, Parbhani district is going through rapid progression in the fields of education. Aided with the Parbhani Agriculture University, located in Parbhani city, the district is witnessing positive changes in academics. Colleges such as Government Veterinary College, and research centres related to agriculture from the university are creating Parbhani's image as an upcoming educational hub.

Parbhani district is divided into nine administrative sub-units (tehsils), namely, Parbhani, Gangakhed, Sonpeth, Pathri, Manwath, Palam, Selu, Jintur, and Purna.

Parbhani city

Agricultural University
The first college of Agriculture was established in this region at Parbhani in 1956 by Hyderabad State Government just before the Maharashtra State reorganisation. The current day Vasantrao Naik Marathwada Agricultural University (VNMAU) was established on 18 May 1972 as Marathwada Agriculture University to fulfil the regional aspirations of agrarian growth, with further responsibilities to provide education in agriculture and allied fields, and to undertake research and facilitate technology transfer in Marathwada region. It is one of the only four Agricultural Universities in the State of Maharashtra.

Since 1970s, Parbhani has proved itself as the hub of educational, research, and extension activities. The famous 'Gaorani' cotton, a breed of Indian cotton, is the result of research facilities at Parbhani. The university was renamed after the name of former Chief Minister of Maharashta, Vasantrao Naik, in 2013.

College of Veterinary and Animal Sciences is located on the campus of VNMAU which is one of the constituent Veterinary Colleges coming under the authority of Maharashtra Animal and Fishery Sciences University, Nagpur from 2000. Earlier this college was established in 1972 as a part of Marathwada Agriculture University.

Colleges
Vasantrao Naik Marathwada Agricultural University
 Government College of Veterinary & Animal Sciences (situated within the campus of MAU, but governed by MAFSU)
 P.D. Jain Homoeopathic Medical College
 Saraswati Dhanwantari Dental College
 Rajiv Gandhi College of Agriculture, and Food Technology
 Shree Shivaji College of Engineering and Management
 Sitaramji Mundada Marathwada Polytechnic College
 Shri Shivaji Law College
 Shree Shivaji College of Arts, Commerce, and Science
 Dnyanopasak College of Arts, Commerce, Science, and Technology
 Sant Tukaram College of Arts, Commerce, Science
 Beleshwar Institute of Nursing
 Yeshwant College of Information Technology, Bioinformatics and Biotechnology
 M.G.M. College of CS & IT
 Beleshwar College of BCA & MCMM
 Dr. Zakir Hussain Women's Degree College
 Queens College of Education
 District Institute of Education and Training

Junior colleges
 Bal Vidya Mandir High School and Jr. College
 Shree Shivaji Junior College of Arts, Commerce, Science, and Vocational Science
 Dr. Zakir Hussain Jr. College of Arts, commerce, Science and MSVC
 Haji Mohammad Padela Jr. College of Science
 Queens Jr. College of Science
 Sant Tukaram Jr. College
 Vishwashanti Dnyanpeeth Junior College

Schools
  Indian School of Learning and Integration
  Bal Vidya Mandir High School, and Junior College
  Marathwada High School
  Dr. Zakir Hussain Urdu Primary and High Schools
  National Urdu High School
  Faran Urdu High School
  Kamel Urdu High School
  Maiudul Muslimeen Urdu High School
 Orchid English School
 Manar International School
 Podar international school
 Scottish Academy School
 St. Augustine School
 Gandhi Vidhyalaya High School
 Global English School
 Arbindo Aksharjyoti School

Jintur town 

Government Polytechnic Institute
Government Industrial Training Institute (ITI)
Dyneshwar Vidyalay
New Era English School
Jawahar Vidyalay
Eklavya Balvidya Mandir (primary & secondary)
Dr. Zakir Hussain Urdu Primary and High School
DSM College, Jintur
Vilasrao Deshmukh Urdu High School and Junior College
Ihyaul Uloom madrasa
SPARTAN Institute of Education and Research
Krantisinh Nana Patil Vastigruh Shivaji Nagar Jintur

References 

Parbhani
Parbhani district
Aurangabad division